Eddie Parker (December 12, 1900 – January 20, 1960) was an American stuntman and actor who appeared in many classic films, mostly westerns and horror films. Some of his more famous films and serials include the 1943 "Batman" (as Lewis Wilson's stunt double), The Crimson Ghost, Abbott and Costello Meet the Mummy (as the Mummy), and Rear Window for Alfred Hitchcock as well as many classic Universal horror films. He appeared three times in the early television series, Tales of the Texas Rangers, and also performed stunts for that program.

Parker died of a heart attack in 1960.

Selected filmography
 The Ghost Rider (1935)
 Frankenstein Meets the Wolf Man (1943)
 Days of Old Cheyenne (1943)
 Trigger Fingers (1946)
 Raiders of the South (1947)
 Trailing Danger (1947)
 Valley of Fear (1947)
 The Fighting Ranger (1948)
 Law of the West (1949)
 Abbott and Costello Meet Dr. Jekyll and Mr. Hyde (1953)
 Rear Window (1954) - Detective (uncredited)
 Abbott and Costello Meet the Mummy (1955)
 The Spoilers (1955)
 Tarantula! (1955)
 Monster on the Campus (1958) 
 Curse of the Undead (1959)

References

External links

 
 

American stunt performers
Male film serial actors
Male actors from Illinois
Actors from Waukegan, Illinois
Male actors from Los Angeles
1900 births
1960 deaths
20th-century American male actors